Cabela's Inc. is an American retailer that specializes in hunting, fishing, boating, camping, shooting and other outdoor recreation merchandise. The chain is based in Sidney, Nebraska. Cabela's was founded by Richard N. Cabela and Jim Cabela in 1961. Cabela's was acquired by Springfield, Missouri-based Bass Pro Shops in 2017 and has been a subsidiary since then.

Cabela's mail-order catalogs are shipped to 50 states and 120 countries. More than 120 million catalogs were mailed in its first year as a public company. It also has "Trophy Properties LLC" (a real estate market), the "Gun Library" (for buying and selling new, used, and collectible firearms).

History 
The company that would become a sporting goods reseller and chain was started in December of 1961. Richard (Dick) N. Cabela purchased $45 worth of fishing flies at a furniture expo in Chicago which he then advertised for sale in a local newspaper advertisement. When his first effort produced only one response, he placed an ad in a national magazine, Sports Afield, which was more successful. Included with each order was a catalog of other products for sale by Cabela.

As the business grew, Cabela and his wife Mary moved their operation to Sidney, Nebraska in 1963. Dick's brother Jim also joined the business. From those beginnings, the company has since grown to a publicly traded corporation with over $3 billion in annual sales.

On February 17, 2014, founder Dick Cabela died at his home in Sidney, Nebraska, at the age of 77.

About half of Cabela's sales come from hunting-related merchandise with about a third derived from the sale of firearms, ammunition and accessories in 2012. Additionally, in 2012 30% of revenue came from direct sales (through catalog and online orders), and 59% from physical retail stores. The remaining 11% of revenue came from its financial subsidiary and credit card business.

In 1996, Gander Mountain, prior to declaring bankruptcy, sold its mail order business to Cabela's with a non-compete clause. In 2007, Cabelas brought suit against them to prevent their re-entry into the mail-order business. Gander Mountain won the lawsuit and began selling online as well.

In February 2013, Cabela's sued Gander Mountain for patent infringement over a fold-up cot that Gander was selling. In December 2013, Gander sued Cabela's for cybersquatting.

In March 2014, Cabela's sold their recreational real estate division, Cabela's Trophy Properties, to Sports Afield.

In December 2015, Cabela's sold their Outdoor Adventures & T.A.G.S. divisions to Worldwide Trophy Adventures.

On October 3, 2016, Bass Pro Shops announced an agreement to acquire Cabela's for $5.5 billion.

Retail stores 

In 2007, Cabela's purchased family-owned S.I.R. Warehouse Sports Store in Winnipeg. In 2010, the Canadian Head Office and Distribution Centre moved across the city, leaving the original location as only a retail store. The company had intended to be a part of the  Lac-Mirabel project near Montreal, which was to include  of retail space, and was planned to open in 2008. But instead, rival chain Bass Pro Shops became one of the mall anchors. In 2011 Cabela's opened a  store in Edmonton, Alberta and a  store opened in Saskatoon in 2012 another  store in Calgary, Alberta opened in 2015.

In early 2012, Cabela's unveiled a new retail initiative called Cabela's Outpost Stores. The first outpost store opened in Union Gap in the fall of 2012.

Cabela's stores have been a target of gun thieves over the years. One store alone in South Carolina had guns stolen from it on three occasions within a one-year interval between 2017 and 2018.

Acquisition by Bass Pro Shops 
On July 5, 2017, the Federal Trade Commission approved the acquisition of Cabela's by Bass Pro Shops. The acquisition was complete on September 25, 2017. The acquisition resulted in 2,000 jobs lost in Cabela's headquarters of Sidney, Nebraska.

Banking and finance 
Founded on March 23, 2001 (FDIC Certificate #57079), Cabela's financial subsidiary was named World's Foremost Bank (WFB, a play on Cabela's marketing moniker, World's Foremost Outfitter). The bank's primary activity was as a credit card issuer for the Cabela's Club Visa card, a branded rewards card. With 11% of total sales attributed to the subsidiary, in 2013 it ranked as the 13th largest issuer of credit cards in the US. Around a third of Cabela's customers have this Visa card.

The subsidiary consisted of a single-branch bank with a deposit market share in the state of Nebraska of just under 1.2 percent, with $505 million in deposits as of 2011. At the end of 2012, the bank claimed to have $3,731,567,000 in assets.

Sean Baker was appointed president of World's Foremost Bank and chief executive officer on January 1, 2013. Baker replaced Joseph M. Friebe, whose planned retirement was announced in June 2012.

2011 FDIC settlement 
In its annual report, Cabela's announced that it has reached a settlement with the Federal Deposit Insurance Corporation (FDIC) regarding its credit card policies and practices. It was ordered to repay wronged cardholders $10 million plus a $250,000 penalty. The subsidiary did not admit to or deny the FDIC's finding, but agreed to do the following:

 Refrain from the Bank's prior practice of contacting a cardholder at the cardholder's place of employment for purposes of collecting a debt after a verbal or written request is made by either the cardholder or the cardholder's employer to cease such contact because the cardholder's employer prohibits such communications.
 Refrain from the Bank's prior practice of assessing a penalty interest rate on balances that existed prior to the event that caused the penalty interest rate to be imposed.
 Refrain from the Bank's prior practice of assessing late fees when periodic payments are due on Sundays or holidays and the payment is posted the following business day.
 Refrain from the Bank's prior practice of assessing a second over-the-credit-limit fee (OL fee) on the first day of a billing cycle when a cardholder exceeded his or her credit limit during the prior billing cycle, was assessed an over limit fee during the prior billing cycle and was over limit at the end of that billing cycle and through the beginning of the next billing cycle.
 Refrain from the Bank's prior practice of imposing an over limit fee if such fee is imposed as a result of applying a cardholder's reduced credit limit to balances that preceded the date of a credit line decrease, or imposing an over limit fee if such fee is imposed solely as a result of a credit line decrease at the end of the billing cycle without adequate notice.
 Refrain from the Bank's prior practice of establishing a minimum periodic payment amount that is insufficient to avoid recurring OL fees.
 Refrain from the Bank's prior practice of implementing an increase in penalty rates without providing adequate notice to cardholders, as required by 12 C.F.R. § 226.9.

Additionally, the FDIC required WFB to make certain changes in their management policy to increase oversight of their credit card business and to prevent further unfair practices.

2011 Royal Bank of Canada loan 
The Bank entered into a $411.7 million commitment with the Royal Bank of Canada under a series of variable funding notes issued by Cabela's Credit Card Master Note Trust. The loan is for three years and accrues interest at a variable rate of commercial paper plus a spread.

2017 Sale to Synovus & Capital One 
As part of the merger with Bass Pro Shops, Cabela's sold the World's Foremost Bank aspect of their business, including over $1 billion in assets, to Synovus who then proceeded to immediately sell Cabela's CLUB credit card program to Capital One.

Video games 

Cabela's has produced several series of video games for a variety of gaming platforms, including Cabela's Legendary Adventures, Cabela's Big Game Hunter series, Cabela's Dangerous Hunts series, and Cabela's Outdoor Adventures series.

Sponsorships 
Cabela's Legendary Adventures sponsors Richard Childress Racing driver Daniel Hemric in the Monster Energy NASCAR Cup Series in partnership with Bass Pro Shops. Cabela's also has a deck lid space on Martin Truex Jr.'s Bass Pro Shops car.

See also 
 List of S&P 400 companies
 Academy Sports + Outdoors
 Bass Pro Shops
 Dick's Sporting Goods
 Gander Mountain
 Legendary Whitetails
 REI
 Scheels All Sports
 Sports Afield
 Sportsman's Warehouse

References

External links 

Official website

Companies formerly listed on the New York Stock Exchange
American companies established in 1961
Retail companies established in 1961
1961 establishments in Nebraska
Companies based in Nebraska
Online retailers of the United States
Sporting goods retailers of the United States
Cheyenne County, Nebraska
Firearm commerce
2017 mergers and acquisitions
American corporate subsidiaries